Motyginskaya Hydroelectric Power Plant (HPP Vydumskaya, Grebenskaya HPP) is a proposed hydroelectric power station, to be built in the lower reaches of the Angara River, in Motyginsky District of Krasnoyarsk Krai, near the village of Motygino. It would have a total power generation capacity of 1100 MW, which is the untapped portion in the Angara HPP Cascade.

Technical overview of the project 
The proposed HPP is a hydroelectric channel-type rock-filled dam with an asphalt/concrete diaphragm of 15 m width and a concrete spillway of about 290 m length. The dam would form a major reservoir 536.6 km² in area with a volume of 19.1 cubic kilometers. The total flooded area would be 53,980 hectares, including 3872 hectares of agricultural land, 108 hectares of settlement land, and 11,719 hectares of forest land. In the power plant building would be installed 10 Kaplan hydraulic units with a capacity of 110 MW each.

External links

Hydroelectric power stations in Russia